Rick Strom (born March 11, 1965) is a former American football quarterback in the National Football League. He played for the Pittsburgh Steelers, Buffalo Bills and the Detroit Lions. He completed 14 out of 22 passes for 162 yards with no touchdowns, 1 interception and 5 sacks in his NFL career with a rate of 66.9, also in his NFL career, Strom had 8 rush attempts for 7 yards averaging about 0.9 yards a carry. He played collegiately for the Georgia Tech Yellow Jackets, from 1983–1987, lettering in the 1983, '84, '86 and '87 seasons. Started 16 games at quarterback over the 1986-87 seasons, started 10 games in 1986, passing for 1,011 yards and five touchdowns and started the first six games of 1987 and completed 83 of 163 passes for 1,066 yards and six touchdowns before a season-ending thumb injury. 

Strom began providing sideline reports for Georgia Tech football radio broadcasts in 2005.  In 2008, he moved up to the booth as color commentator, paired with veteran Tech play-by-play announcer, Wes Durham.

Early life
Strom graduated from Fox Chapel Area High School in Pittsburgh, Pennsylvania.

Professional career

Pittsburgh Steelers
Strom Signed with the Pittsburgh Steelers on April 28 1988.

Buffalo Bills
Strom signed with the Buffalo Bills to back up with Jim Kelly and Frank Reich.

See also 

 List of Georgia Tech Yellow Jackets starting quarterbacks

External links
 NFL.com player page

1965 births
Living people
American football quarterbacks
Buffalo Bills players
Georgia Tech Yellow Jackets football players
Pittsburgh Steelers players
Players of American football from Pittsburgh